Temple is a town in Cotton County, Oklahoma, United States. The population was 1,002 at the 2010 census, a decline of 12.6 percent from 1,146 at the 2000 census. The town is named for the celebrated trial lawyer of Texas and Oklahoma Territory, Temple Lea Houston (1860–1905), the youngest son of General Sam Houston.

Geography
Temple is located at the intersection of Oklahoma State highways 5 and 65. Walters is approximately seven miles to the northwest.

Demographics

As of the census of 2000, there were 1,146 people, 488 households, and 301 families residing in the town. There were 604 housing units at an average density of 462.1 per square mile (178.0/km2). The racial makeup of the town was 75.65% White, 11.34% African American, 4.89% Native American, 0.17% Asian, 4.71% from other races, and 3.23% from two or more races. Hispanic or Latino of any race were 7.24% of the population.

There were 488 households, out of which 27.3% had children under the age of 18 living with them, 46.1% were married couples living together, 12.9% had a female householder with no husband present, and 38.3% were non-families. 34.4% of all households were made up of individuals, and 18.2% had someone living alone who was 65 years of age or older. The average household size was 2.27 and the average family size was 2.93.

In the town, the population was spread out, with 24.3% under the age of 18, 7.9% from 18 to 24, 24.2% from 25 to 44, 21.2% from 45 to 64, and 22.5% who were 65 years of age or older. The median age was 40 years. For every 100 females, there were 91.0 males. For every 100 females age 18 and over, there were 84.7 males.

The median income for a household in the town was $18,864, and the median income for a family was $24,688. Males had a median income of $26,806 versus $17,708 for females. The per capita income for the town was $12,448. About 22.8% of families and 29.5% of the population were below the poverty line, including 43.3% of those under age 18 and 20.0% of those age 65 or over.

Notable people
LaDonna Harris (born 1931), Comanche political activist, birthplace
Pepper Martin (1904—1965), Major League baseball player, birthplace
Spec Sanders (January 26, 1919 – July 6, 2003), professional football player, birthplace

References

Towns in Cotton County, Oklahoma
Towns in Oklahoma